Sybil or Sibyl is a feminine given name of Greek origin given in reference to the sibyls, oracles of Ancient Greece. It has been in common use in Christian countries since the Middle Ages. Latinate forms of the name in use by 1381 included Sibilla and Sibilia. It was thought suitable as a name for girls by Christians, despite its pagan origins, because the sibyls had delivered messages from a deity and were thought to have been blessed by God with partial understanding of the coming of Jesus Christ.  It became more common in the 1800s. Usage of the name recently increased due to a character on the popular TV series Downton Abbey.   Sibylle, a French version of the name, is considered a bon chic bon genre name more likely to be given to girls from upper class French families.

Sibil 
Sibil Pektorosoğlu (born 1974=, Armenian-Turkish pop singer
Zabel Sibil Asadour (1863–1934), Armenian poet, writer, publisher and philanthropist

Sybil

A–F
Sybil Andrews (1898–1992), English-Canadian artist, specialised in printmaking, best known for her modernist linocuts
Sybil Arundale (1879–1965), English stage and film actress, born Sybil Kelly
Sybil Atteck (1911–1975), pioneering Trinidadian painter known for her work in watercolor
Megan Sybil Baker (born 1954), pseudonym of Linnea Sinclair, American writer of Science Fiction and Fantasy Romance
Sybil Bauer (1903–1927), American competition swimmer, Olympic champion, former world record-holder
Sybil Mary Collings Beaumont or Sibyl Hathaway DBE (1884–1974), Dame of Sark from 1927 until her death
Sybil Bennett (1904–1956), Canadian politician
Sybil Moseley Bingham (1792–1848), American teacher in the Hawaiian Islands
Sybil Brand (1899–2004), American philanthropist and activist
Sybil G. Brinton, author of the novel Old Friends and New Fancies (1913)
Sybil Brintrup (1954–2020), Chilean conceptual artist, working with traditional and digital media
Sybil le Brocquy (1892–1973), Irish playwright, patron of the arts and conservationist
Sybil Buck (born 1972), American musician, yoga instructor and fashion model
Ethel Sybil Burwell or Ethel Turner (1870–1958), English-born Australian novelist and children's literature writer
Sybil Campbell OBE (1889–1977), the first woman to be appointed as a stipendiary magistrate in Britain
Sybil Carmen (1896–1929), American actress, dancer, and Ziegfeld girl
Sybil Chaplin, known as Judith Chaplin (1939–1993), Conservative Party politician in the United Kingdom
Sybil Cholmondeley, Marchioness of Cholmondeley CBE (1894–1989), British socialite, Chief Staff Officer in the Women's Royal Naval Service (WRNS) during World War II
Sybil Christopher (1929–2013), formerly known as Sybil Burton, Welsh actress and theatre director
Sybil Claiborne (1923–1992), novelist, short story writer, pacifist, member of the Board of the War Resisters League
Sybil Colefax (1874–1950), English interior designer and decorator, and socialite
Sybil Connolly (1921–1998), Dublin-based Irish fashion designer known for creating fashion from Irish textiles
Sybil of Conversano (died 1103), wealthy Norman heiress, Duchess of Normandy by marriage to Robert Curthose
Sybil Cookson (1890–1963), journalist and writer of romantic novels
Sybil Cooper (1900–1970), British physiologist
Sybil Craig OAM (1901–1989), Australian painter
Sybil Danning (born 1952), Austrian-American actress, model, and film producer
Sybil Isabel Dorsett or Shirley Ardell Mason (1923–1998), American art teacher reputed to have dissociative identity disorder
Sybil Dunlop (1889–1968), British jewellery designer, best known work in the late Arts and Crafts style
Sybil Elgar (1914–2007), the first special-education teacher for those with autism in the United Kingdom
Sybil Evers (1904–1963), English singer and actress
Sybil B. G. Eysenck (1927–2020), personality psychologist and the widow of the psychologist Hans Eysenck
Sybil Fane, Countess of Westmorland (1871–1910), born Lady Sybil Mary St Clair-Erskine, was a British aristocrat and socialite
Sybil Flory (1920–2017), pharmacist, seamstress and teacher
Jean Sybil La Fontaine (born 1931), British anthropologist and emeritus professor of the London School of Economics

G–M
Sybil Gibson (1908–1995), American painter
Sybil Mullen Glover (1908–1995), British artist known for her landscape and marine paintings
Sybil Niden Goldrich, consumer advocate in the fight for women's health relating to breast implants
Sybil Gordon (1902–1981), English singer and actress
Lady Sybil Grant (1879–1955), British writer and artist
Lady Sybil Grey OBE (1882–1966), British philanthropist and Voluntary Aid Detachment nurse
Sybil Grey (1860–1939), born Ellen Sophia Taylor, was a British singer and actress during the Victorian era
Sybil Grove, English actress
Sybil B. Harrington (1908–1998), American philanthropist
Sibyl Hathaway DBE (1884–1974), Dame of Sark from 1927 until her death
Sibyl Heijnen (1961), Dutch visual artist, part of the second generation after 1960
Dulcie Sybil Holland (1913–2000), Australian composer and music educator
Sybil Holmes (1889–1979), American politician, the first woman elected to the Massachusetts Senate
Sibyl Marvin Huse (1866-1939), French-born American author of religious books and teacher of Christian Science
Sybil Joyce Hylton MBE (1913–2006), Caymanian community volunteer and social advocate
Sybil Irving MBE (1897–1973), founder and controller of the Australian Women's Army Service during World War II
Sybil Henley Jacobson, (1881–1953), Canadian painter
Sybil Jason (1927–2011), South African-born, American child film actress
Sybil Jefferies (stage name Sweet Sable), American house and R&B vocalist best known for her work during the 1990s
Sybil Kent Kane (1856–1946), American socialite, prominent in New York Society during the Gilded Age
Sybil Kathigasu GM (1899–1948), Malayan Eurasian nurse who supported the resistance during the Japanese occupation of Malaya
Sybil Kein (born 1939), Louisiana Creole poet, playwright, scholar, and musician
Sibyl Kempson (born 1973), American playwright and performer
Sibyll-Anka Klotz (born 1961), German politician
Sybil Leek (1917–1982), English witch, astrologer, occult author and self-proclaimed psychic
May Sybil Leslie (1887–1937), English chemist who worked with Marie Curie and Ernest Rutherford
Sybil Lewis (surgeon), OSS (1874–1918), early Scottish surgeon who served with distinction in Serbia during the First World War
Sybil Lewis (actress), actress in the United States
Sybil Ludington (1761–1839), heroine of the American Revolutionary War
Sybil Lupp (1916–1994), New Zealand mechanic, motor-racing driver, garage proprietor and motor vehicle dealer
Sybil Lynch (born 1965), American R&B and pop singer–songwriter
Sybil Marshall (1913–2005), British writer, novelist, social historian, broadcaster, folklorist, educationalist
Dame Elvira Sibyl Marie Laughton Mathews, DBE (1888–1959), British military officer and administrator
Sybil I. McLaughlin MBE (1928–2022), first Speaker of the Legislative Assembly of the Cayman Islands
Sybil C. Mobley (1925–2015), Dean Emerita of the Florida Agricultural and Mechanical University (FAMU) School of Business and Industry
Sibyl Moholy-Nagy (1903–1971), German non-fiction writer
Sybil Montagu, Prioress of Amesbury, daughter of John de Montagu, 1st Baron Montagu and his wife Margaret de Monthermer
Sybil Morgan (1898–1983), British philatelist on the Roll of Distinguished Philatelists
Sibyl Morrison (1895–1961), Australian lawyer
Sybil Morrison (1893–1984), British pacifist, suffragist and activist with several other radical causes
Sybil Moses (1939–2009), American lawyer and judge
Sybil Mulcahy (born 1973), Irish journalist and presenter
Josephine and Sybil Mulvany, New Zealand weavers

N–Z
Sybil Neville-Rolfe OBE (1885–1955), social hygienist, founder of the Eugenics Society
Sybil Fenton Newall or Queenie Newall (1854–1929), English archer who won the gold medal at the 1908 Summer Olympics in London
Sybil Robson Orr (born 1962), American film producer
Sybil (wife of Pain fitzJohn), Anglo-Norman noblewoman in 12th-century England
Daphne Margaret Sybil Desiree Park or Daphne Park CMG, OBE, FRSA (1921–2010), British spy
Sybil Phoenix OBE (née Marshall; born 1927), British community worker of Guyanese birth
Sybil Plumlee (1911–2012), American teacher, caseworker, and police officer in Portland, Oregon
Sibyl Pool (1901–1973), politician from Alabama
Sybil Pye (1879–1958), self-trained British bookbinder famed for her inlay Art Deco leather bindings
Tabitha Sybil Quaye (born 1938), Ghanaian politician and a former member of parliament for Takoradi
Sybil of the Rhine (1098–1179), aka Hildegard of Bingen, German Benedictine abbess and polymath, writer, composer, philosopher, mystic, visionary, and medical writer and practitioner
Sybil Sassoon (1894–1989), British officer during World War 2
Sybil M. Rock (1909–1981), pioneer in mass spectrometry and computing
Sybil Ruscoe (born 1960), British radio and television presenter
Sybil Sanderson (1864–1903), American operatic soprano during the Parisian Belle Époque
Sybil Seely (1900–1984), silent film actress who worked with Buster Keaton
Sybil P. Seitzinger, oceanographer and climate scientist at the Pacific Institute for Climate Solutions
Sybil Shainwald (born 1928), American attorney specializing in women's health law, activist for women's health reform
Sybil Shearer (1912–2005), American choreographer, dancer and writer
Sybil Shepherd (born 1950), American actress, singer and former model
Sybil Sheridan (born 1953), writer and British Reform rabbi
Sybil Smith (born 1966), American former collegiate swimmer
Sybil Smolova, Czech-Austrian dancer and film actress of the silent era
Sybil Stockdale (1924–2015), American campaigner for families of Americans missing in South East Asia
Sybil Tawse (1886–1971), English artist and illustrator
Sybil Temtchine, American actress
Sybil Thomas, Viscountess Rhondda, DBE (1857–1941), British suffragette, feminist, and philanthropist
Sybil Thorndike (1882–1976), English actress who toured internationally in Shakespearean productions
Ethel Sibyl Turner (1870–1958), English-born Australian novelist and children's literature writer
Sybil Ward (1894–1977), one of the first female lawyers in Delaware
Sybil Werden (1924–2007), German dancer and actress during the 1950s
Sybil Wettasinghe (1927–2020), children's book writer and an illustrator in Sri Lanka
Sybil Whigham, (1871–1954), Scottish golfer
Sibyl Taite Widdows (1876–1960), British Scientist, member of the Chemistry department at the London School of Medicine for Women for 40 years
Sibyl Wilbur (1871–1946), American journalist, suffragist, and author of a biography of Mary Baker Eddy
Sybil Wolfram (1931–1993), English philosopher and writer of German Jewish origin
Sybil Yazzie (1917–1918), Diné (Navajo) painter

Fictional characters called Sybil include:
Sibyl, a character in Agents of S.H.I.E.L.D.
Sybil Barton, a character in 1941 American comedy film Angels with Broken Wings, played by Binnie Barnes
Sybil Birling, a character in the play An Inspector Calls by J. B. Priestley
Sybil Branson, a character in Downton Abbey played by Jessica Brown Findlay, or her daughter, nicknamed "Sybbie"
Sybil Dvorak, a mutant supervillain character appearing in American comic books published by Marvel Comics
Sybil Fawlty, a character played by Prunella Scales in the BBC TV series Fawlty Towers
Sybil Pandemik, a character in Sam & Max
Sybil Stone, a character played by Diane Keaton in the film The Family Stone
Sybill Trelawney, a character in the Harry Potter series
Sibyl Vane, a character in the novel The Picture of Dorian Gray by Oscar Wilde
Lady Sybil Vimes, a character in the Discworld series by Terry Pratchett
Sybil Reisz, a boss in the game Transistor

See also
The Adventures of Sybil Brent (German: Das Abenteuer der Sibylle Brant), a 1925 German silent film
Eli and Sybil Jones House, a historic house at Maine State Route 3 and Dirigo Road in South China, Maine
Sybil Brand Institute, disused women's jail in Monterey Park, Los Angeles County, California
The Morning Show with Sybil & Martin, a morning magazine show that aired on TV3 (Ireland)
Sybil Halpern Milton Memorial Prize, annual award by the German Studies Association (GSA)

Notes